This is a list of synagogues in Switzerland.

See also

List of synagogues
History of the Jews in Switzerland

 
Synagogues
Switzerland